Cheng Shu-min is a Taiwanese politician who led the Council of Cultural Affairs between 1994 and 1996.

Career
Cheng was close to Lee Teng-hui, and between 1998 and 1992, served as an envoy of Lee's presidential administration to China. She and 's visits to China preceded the Wang–Koo summit in 1993. Cheng was later appointed chair of China Television, and has also served on the supervisory board of Procomp Informatics.

References

Living people
Women government ministers of Taiwan
Taiwanese Ministers of Culture
Year of birth missing (living people)